Harry C. Hoffman  (January 5, 1875 – November 13, 1942) was a Major League Baseball outfielder who played for the Washington Senators in 1904 and the Boston Doves in 1907.

External links

1875 births
1942 deaths
Major League Baseball outfielders
Washington Senators (1901–1960) players
Boston Doves players
Baseball players from New Jersey
Sportspeople from Gloucester County, New Jersey
Norfolk Skippers players
Montreal Royals players
Holyoke Paperweights players
Hartford Senators players
Providence Grays (minor league) players
Oakland Oaks (baseball) players
San Francisco Seals (baseball) players
Reading Pretzels players
Peoria Distillers players